Tin Sam Tsuen is a village in Pat Heung, Yuen Long District, Hong Kong.

Administration
Tin Sam is a recognized village under the New Territories Small House Policy. Tin Sam Tsuen is one of the villages represented within the Pat Heung Rural Committee. For electoral purposes, Tin Sam Tsuen is part of the Pat Heung South constituency, which is currently represented by Lai Wing-tim.

References

External links

 Delineation of area of existing village Tin Sum Tsuen (Pat Heung) for election of resident representative (2019 to 2022)

Villages in Yuen Long District, Hong Kong
Pat Heung